Patrice Loiseau (born 10 May 1959) is a French former professional footballer who played as a centre-back. In his career, he played for INF Vichy, Metz, Auxerre, and Tours. He scored eight goals in 81 Division 1 appearances.

Honours 
INF Vichy

 Division 3: 1978–79
 Coupe Gambardella: 1977–78

Tours

 Division 2: 1983–84

References 

1959 births
Living people
Sportspeople from Perpignan
French footballers
Association football central defenders
INF Vichy players
FC Metz players
AJ Auxerre players
Tours FC players
French Division 3 (1971–1993) players
Ligue 1 players
Ligue 2 players
Footballers from Occitania (administrative region)